Devroad  is a village in the Jhunjhunu district of Rajasthan,  from Pilani.

References

Villages in Jhunjhunu district